Charles Scriven (born 1945, Prineville, Oregon) is a Seventh-day Adventist theologian who served as President of Kettering College from 2000 through 2013.  He is a member of the Board of Directors of the Kettering foundation  and chair of the board of Adventist Forums, publisher of Spectrum magazine.

Career
After attending Walla Walla University in College Place, Washington, Scriven obtained a master's degree in divinity at Andrews University in 1968. In 1984 he obtained a Ph.D. in systematic theology and Christian social ethics at the Graduate Theological Union in Berkeley, California. He served for six years as minister in the Seventh-day Adventist church in Sligo in Montgomery County, Maryland. In 1992 he was appointed  president of Columbia Union College in Takoma Park, Maryland. He has been an editor of Insight, a Seventh-day Adventist magazine for young people.

Selected publications
 The Demons Have Had It: A Theological ABC (1976)
 The Transformation of Culture: Christian social ethics after H. Richard Niebuhr (1988)
 The Promise of Peace: Dare to Experience the Advent Hope (2009)

See also 

 Seventh-day Adventist Church
 Seventh-day Adventist theology
 Seventh-day Adventist eschatology
 History of the Seventh-day Adventist Church
 28 fundamental beliefs
 Questions on Doctrine
 Teachings of Ellen White
 Inspiration of Ellen White
 Prophecy in the Seventh-day Adventist Church
 Investigative judgment
 The Pillars of Adventism
 Second Advent
 Baptism by Immersion
 Conditional Immortality
 Historicism
 Three Angels' Messages
 End times
 Sabbath in Seventh-day Adventism
 Ellen G. White
 Adventist Review
 Adventist
 Seventh-day Adventist Church Pioneers
 Seventh-day Adventist worship
 Adventist Health Studies
 Ellen G. White Estate

References

Seventh-day Adventist religious workers
Seventh-day Adventist theologians
American theologians
American Seventh-day Adventists
Living people
People from Prineville, Oregon
Walla Walla University alumni
1945 births